The Wildflower Triathlon is a triathlon (swim-bike-run race) held at Lake San Antonio in Central California since 1983, the first winner being Dean "The Machine" Harper. It is held the first weekend in May each year.

The original course was expanded to the standardized half-Ironman distance (1.2 mi / 56 mi / 13.1 mi) in the late 1980s, and is often referred to as simply the long course. Two more races have subsequently been added to the event: an Olympic-distance (1.5 km / 40 km / 10 km) race and a short or "sprint" mountain-bike triathlon (0.25 mi / 9.7 mi / 2 mi).

Known for a particularly hilly and grueling course, it is one of the largest triathlon events in the world, with 7,500 athletes and 30,000 spectators attending each year at its peak.  Traditionally it is associated with a Wildflower festival, though in recent years the festival had been eclipsed by the increasingly large athletic event. A drastic drop in lake level in 2014 led to a modified course and lower attendance. Shortly after the 2015 event, the Monterey County Board of Supervisors announced it would close Lake San Antonio due to low water levels. The event was canceled in 2017 and 2019. It was canceled in 2020, and was not scheduled for 2021, due to the ongoing COVID-19 pandemic.

Events

Long course

Distances
1.2 m Swim, 56 m Bike, 13.1 m Run

Swim course
The  swim course begins at the Lynch Ramp. The race starts in waves, with the professional men, the professional women, age group men, age group women, and relay teams. Swimmers swim in a clockwise direction on a rectangular course. There are course marker buoys and lifeguards on kayaks lining the course. Swimmers exit the water, go up the ramp, through the timing area and into the transition area.

Bike course
Triathletes leave the transition area to the north and make a quick left through the finish line chute. Athletes follow the road down Shoreline Drive to the beach area and as it turns right up "Beach Hill", a steep  climb. The course proceeds onto San Antonio Drive and out of the park onto Interlake Road past the first checkpoint at mile six. Bicyclists will proceed on Interlake Road over rolling hills before turning onto Jolon Road (19 miles). Triathletes will have small rolling hills along Jolon Road from mile 26 to 42. At mile 42, follow Nacimiento left up "Nasty Grade", a nearly five-mile grade which climbs  from bottom to top of "Heart Rate Hill." At the top of the hill it's back onto Interlake Road and then at the  point a right turn onto San Antonio Drive and head back to the park. Finally, down Lynch Hill for the last descent.

Run course
The  run course is 60% trails and 40% roads. Triathletes will depart the transition area to the southwest and climb the Lynch Ramp stairs. Once on the trail below the resort store lawn athletes cross the bridge and proceed down the beach access road through "Beach City." At the base of "Beach Hill" athletes continue straight off of the road and on to the trails along the shoreline until the Harris Creek campgrounds. After this, follow the paved road as it turns right past the launch ramp for a short climb up the hill. At mile 3 turn left onto the backcountry trails. Triathletes proceed back into the park alongside the road on trails and fire roads through Redondo Vista Campgrounds, the TNT campsite area, and the overflow camping area. At mile 9, the course returns to the roads, making a right turn at San Antonio Drive. Triathletes proceed up the road and down the hill to the PowerBar turn-around point and at mile 10 they have a chance to see where their competition is as they race back up the hill and proceed back on San Antonio Drive. Finally, athletes head down Lynch Hill towards the finish chute and finish line.

Olympic Distance

Distances
1.5k Swim, 40k Bike, 10k Run

Swim course
The 1.5k (.93 mile) swim course will begin at the Lynch Ramp. There will be more than 20 wave starts at 5-minute intervals beginning with collegiate men and women, age group men and women, Team in Training men and women, and relay teams. Swimmers will swim in a clockwise direction on the triangular course. The course will have sailboats, clearly marked, at the corners and there will be course marker buoys and lifeguards on long boards every 100 yards. The swimmers will exit the water, go through the timing area, up the ramp and into the transition area.

Bike course
The bike course is 40K (24.8 miles) long and should be considered relatively difficult. The bike portion of the course will be marked by large green diamonds. Cyclist will leave the transition area to the north and proceed directly up "Lynch Hill." On San Antonio Drive athletes head out of the park and onto Interlake Road. On Interlake Road, triathletes proceed over rolling hills to the turn-around point at mile 12.4. Triathletes will return to the park on the same roads. As they re-enter the park, riders turn left and head down Lynch Hill and back to the transition area.

Run course
The 10k (6.2 mile) run course is a combination of road and trails through campgrounds and challenging hills. The run portion of the course will be marked by Small Green Diamonds.  Triathletes will depart the transition area to the southwest, and climb the Lynch Ramp stairs.  Turn left on the trail below the resort store lawn.  Cross the bridge and proceed down the beach access road through "Beach City."  At the base of "Beach Hill," continue straight off of the road and on to the trails along the shoreline (no beach hill this time).  Follow the trails through Harris Creek campgrounds, and proceed past the launch ramp parking lot and onto Lake San Antonio Drive.  Turn right up San Antonio Drive and at the Beach Hill intersection triathletes leave the road for trails and follow the fire access trail back to Lynch intersection. Finally, triathletes return to the road and turn right down Lynch Hill to the finish chute and the finish line.

Mountain Bike Sprint Triathlon

Distances
0.25m Swim, 9.7m Bike, 2 mi Run

Sprint Distance Triathlon

Distances
0.25 Swim, 20k Bike, 5k Run

5K and 10K
In 2018, Wildflower added trail run events at 5K and 10K distances.

Stand-Up Paddleboard
Added to the event for 2018, Wildflower features stand-up paddleboarding events as an alternative to the original long-run, Olympic, and sprint distance events.

Distances
2 & 6 mile

Course closures
The AVIA Wildflower Triathlons Festival has established course closures for each portion of the triathlon. These closures are based upon the start time of the last individual age group wave and are for the safety of participants and volunteers.

Cut-off times

Long course

Swim: 10:10 AM (male), 10:30 AM (female) (1:05 after the start of the last individual age group wave)
Bike: 2:25 PM (male), 2:45 PM (female) (5:20 after the start of the last individual age group wave)
Run: 5:25 PM (male), 5:45 PM (female) (8:20 after the start of the last individual age group wave)

Olympic course

Swim: 11:20 AM (male), 12:05 PM (female) (1:20 after the start of the last individual age group wave)
Bike: 1:50 PM (male), 2:35 PM (female) (3:50 after the start of the last individual age group wave)
Run: 3:20 PM (male), 4:05 PM (female) (5:20 after the start of the last individual age group wave)

Mountain bike course

There are no course closures for the mountain bike event.

Course records 
The current course records are held by Terenzo Bozzone and Heather Jackson. In 2006, Bozzone completed the half-Ironman distance in 3 hours, 53 minutes and 43 seconds, while Jackson posted a time of 4 hours, 26 minutes and 29 seconds in 2012.

Corporate sponsorship
The triathlon is owned and operated by Motiv Group. It was previously sponsored by Avia and was known as the "Avia Wildflower Triathlons" until 2013.

See also
Wildflower: The Legendary California Triathlon

References

External links 
 WildflowerTriathlon.com
 Wildflower: The Documentary Film
 A detailed description of the course

Triathlon competitions in the United States
Recurring sporting events established in 1983
Sports competitions in California
1983 establishments in California
Sports in Monterey County, California